The 2015–16 Persian Gulf Pro League (formerly known as Iran Pro League) was the 33rd season of Iran's Football League and 15th as Persian Gulf Pro League since its establishment in 2001. Sepahan were the defending champions. The season featured 14 teams from the 2014–15 Persian Gulf Cup and two new teams promoted from the 2014–15 Azadegan League: Siah Jamegan and Esteghlal Ahvaz. The league started on 30 July 2015 and ended on 13 May 2016. Esteghlal Khuzestan won the Pro League title for the first time in their history (total first Iranian title).

Teams

Stadia and locations

Note: Table lists in alphabetical order

Number of teams by region

Personnel and kits

Note: Flags indicate national team as has been defined under FIFA eligibility rules. Players may hold more than one non-FIFA nationality.

Managerial changes

Foreign players
The number of foreign players is restricted to four per Iran Pro League team, including a slot for a player from AFC countries. A team can use four foreign players on the field in each game, including at least one player from the AFC country.

League table

Results

Positions by round

Clubs season-progress

Season statistics

Top Goalscorers 

Last updated: 13 May 2016
Source: Soccerway.com
Source: Iplstats.com

Hat-tricks

Top Assistants 

Last updated: 13 May 2016
Source: Varzesh3.com
Source: Iplstats.com

Clean Sheets 

Last Update: 13 May 2016
Source: Iplstats.com

Scoring 

First goal of the season: Sajjad Shahbazzadeh for Esteghlal against Siah Jamegan (30 July 2015)
Fastest goal of the season: 56 seconds, Jalaleddin Alimohammadi for Saba Qom against Naft Tehran (6 August 2015)
Latest goal of the season: 96 minutes, Mohammad Ghazi for Saba Qom against Esteghlal Khuzestan (14 September 2015)
Largest winning margin: 5 goals
Rah Ahan 5–0 Esteghlal Ahvaz (16 October 2015)
Tractor Sazi 5–0 Esteghlal Ahvaz (13 May 2016)
Highest scoring game: 8 goals
Tractor Sazi 4–4 Zob Ahan (27 October 2015)
Most goals scored in a match by a losing team: 3 goals
Gostaresh Foulad 4–3 Zob Ahan (31 March 2016)

Awards

Team of the Season

Goalkeeper: Mohammad Rashid Mazaheri (Zob Ahan)
Defence: Sadegh Moharrami (Perspolis), Majid Hosseini (Esteghlal), Jalal Hosseini (Perspolis), Mohammad Ansari   (Perspolis)
Midfield: Server Djeparov (Esteghlal), Omid Ebrahimi (Esteghlal), Mohammad Reza Hosseini (Zob Ahan)
Attack: Mehdi Torabi (Saipa), Ali Alipour (Perspolis), Vahid Amiri (Perspolis)

Player of the Season

Mehdi Torabi was awarded as the best player of the season. Ali Gholizadeh was also awarded as the best young player of the season.

Other awards

Branko Ivankovic was awarded as the best coach of the season.
Mohammad Rashid Mazaheri won the best Goalkeeper award.
Jalal Hosseini won the best Defender award.
Omid Ebrahimi won the best Midfielder award.
Ali Alipour won the best Striker award.

Attendances

Average home attendances

Attendances by round

Notes:Updated to games played on 13 May 2016. Source: Iranleague.ir  Matches with spectator bans are not included in average attendances  Esteghlal Ahvaz played their matches against Esteghlal and Siah Jamegan at Ghadir  Foolad played their match against Gostaresh at Takhti Ahvaz  Gostaresh played their matches against Persepolis and Tractor Sazi at Sahand  Rah Ahan played their match against Esteghlal at Azadi  Saipa played their match against Esteghlal at Takhti Tehran  Saipa played their match against Persepolis at Azadi

Highest attendances

Notes:Updated to games played on 13 May 2016. Source: Iranleague.ir

See also
 2015–16 Azadegan League
 2015–16 Iran Football's 2nd Division
 2015–16 Iran Football's 3rd Division
 2015–16 Hazfi Cup
 Iranian Super Cup
 2015–16 Iranian Futsal Super League

References

Iran Pro League seasons